This is a list of lighthouses in Jamaica. There are nine onshore lighthouses in operation and two offshore. They are maintained by the Port Authority of Jamaica, an agency of the Ministry of Transport and Works.

Cornwall

 Lover’s Leap Lighthouse, Southfield  *  
 Negril Lighthouse, Negril  *  
 Rose Hall Lighthouse, St James  *

Middlesex

 Galina Lighthouse, Galina  *  
 Lazaretto Cairn Lighthouse, St Catherine Parish  *  
 Portland Lighthouse, Portland Point  *

Surrey

 Folly Lighthouse, Port Antonio  *  
 Morant Point Lighthouse, Morant Point  *  
 Plumb Point Lighthouse, Palisadoes  *

Offshore

 Morant Cays Lighthouse, Morant Cays  *  
 Pedro Cays Lighthouse, Pedro Bank  *

See also
Transport in Jamaica
Lists of lighthouses and lightvessels

References

External links

The lighthouses of Jamaica, Frans Eijgenraam, 2000.
Lighthouses, Jamaica National Heritage Trust, 2005.

 NGA List of Lights – Pub.110 Retrieved 29 December 2016

 
Lighthouses
Jamaica
Lighthouses